The Sargent Icefield is a large icefield located on the eastern portion of the Kenai Peninsula bordering Prince William Sound in Alaska. The ice field has numerous outflow glaciers including the Chenega, Princeton, and Ellsworth Glaciers.

See also
List of glaciers and icefields

References

External links

Bodies of ice of Kenai Peninsula Borough, Alaska
Bodies of ice of Unorganized Borough, Alaska
Glaciers of Chugach Census Area, Alaska
Ice fields of Alaska